Chianeh or Chiyana may refer to:
 Chianeh, Naqadeh
 Chianeh, Piranshahr